Steindachner's Angolan mormyrid (Heteromormyrus pauciradiatus) is a species of elephantfish in the family Mormyridae being the only member of its genus. It is found only in the coastal river basins in Angola in Africa.

References 

Endemic fauna of Angola
Weakly electric fish
Monotypic ray-finned fish genera
Mormyridae
Fish of Africa
Fish described in 1866